Ivan Dmitriyevich Borisov (1913 – 25 December 1939) was a Soviet military pilot who was posthumously awarded the title Hero of the Soviet Union.

Biography
Ivan Borisov was born in 1913. In December 1939, he served as a command pilot in the 1st squadron, of the 5 IAP-KBF, which was equipped with Polikarpov I-153s. On 23 December his squadron shot down a Finnish aircraft, a VL Kotka, near Paldiski. At 1245 (Finnish time), a Blackburn Ripon IIF of LeLv 36 took off at Paldiski, the Ripon was flown by 24-year-old Kaj Uolevi Söderholm and his observer Esko Antero Huhanantti. It was then reported by the Soviet radio that a Finnish reconnaissance aircraft at Pakri had been shot down by interceptors at 1405 and that both crew members were killed when they tried to escape the burning aircraft. It is believed that this was the aircraft that was shot down by Borisov's crew. In addition to this victory, Borisov flew nine more missions in the Winter War, but was shot down and killed on 25 December 1939, over the Hanko Peninsula. He was awarded the Gold Star of the Hero of the Soviet Union on 7 February 1940.

References

1913 births
1939 deaths
People from Mytishchi
People from Moskovsky Uyezd
Soviet Air Force officers
Soviet aviators
Winter War pilots
Soviet military personnel of the Winter War
Soviet military personnel killed in World War II
Heroes of the Soviet Union